Maurice Carter (24 April 1913 in London, England – April 2000 in London, England) was a British production designer. He was one of the first in England to use back projection. He also founded the Guild of Film Art Directors a.k.a. British Film Designers Guild.

He was nominated for 2 Oscars and 3 BAFTAs.

Selected films
 Good-Time Girl (1948)
 Christopher Columbus (1949)
 Always a Bride (1953)
 Desperate Moment (1953)
 The Spanish Gardener (1957)
 Anne of the Thousand Days (1969)
 The Land That Time Forgot (1975)
 The People that Time Forgot (1977)
 The First Great Train Robbery (1978)

References

External links

1913 births
2000 deaths
British film designers